Weird Science-Fantasy was an American science fiction-fantasy anthology comic, that was part of the EC Comics line in the early 1950s. Over a 14-month span, the comic ran for seven issues, starting in March 1954 with issue #23 and ending with issue #29 in May/June 1955.

Origin 
The comic, published by Bill Gaines and edited by Al Feldstein, was a merger of two previous bi-monthly titles, Weird Science and Weird Fantasy, which ran from 1950 to 1953, both ending at issue #22. Because of the losses suffered from those two comics, Gaines and Feldstein combined the two into a single comic, published quarterly and priced at 15 cents. The price would be lowered back down to 10 cents after the first two issues. The comic reverted to a bi-monthly schedule with issue #27 in January/February 1955. In the summer of 1955, there was yet another title change as Weird Science-Fantasy became Incredible Science Fiction for the final four issues.

Artists and writers 
Cover illustrations were by Feldstein, Wally Wood, Al Williamson and Frank Frazetta. Artists who drew stories for this EC title were Feldstein, Wood, Williamson, Frazetta, Joe Orlando, Bernard Krigstein, Angelo Torres, George Evans, Reed Crandall and Jack Kamen. Writers included Feldstein, Gaines, Harlan Ellison (who contributed a single story in issue 24), Otto Binder, Jack Oleck, and Carl Wessler.

The final issue featured a cover by Frank Frazetta originally intended for a Famous Funnies cover illustrating Buck Rogers, but it was considered too violent for that comic book. Gaines bought the rights to use the cover (the only instance at EC where Gaines bought only the rights to the art, and not the art itself), and it was used with some minor revisions. The cover was later described by publisher Russ Cochran as "the most outstanding cover ever put on a comic book".

Stories and themes
Issue 26 was a special issue about real reported encounters with flying saucers. Feldstein worked with Major Donald Keyhoe, a former marine pilot who was considered the leading popular writer on the subject at the time.

Influences and adaptations 
As with the other EC comics edited by Feldstein, the stories in this comic were primarily based on Gaines reading a large number of science fiction stories and using them to develop "springboards" from which he and Feldstein could launch new stories. Specific story influences that have been identified include the following:

"Fair Trade" (issue 23) - Stephen Vincent Benét's "By the Waters of Babylon" 
"Adaptability" (issue 27) - Robert A. Heinlein's Universe
"The Inferiors" (issue 28) - Murray Leinster's "The Lost Race"

Other stories were authorized adaptations, sometimes with the active participation of the original author.  Otto Binder adapted some stories that he and his brother Earl had published in the 1940s. This included "The Teacher From Mars" (#24) and the three-part Adam Link series that appeared in issues 27 through 29.

"The Flying Machine" (#23) and "A Sound of Thunder" (#25) were official adaptations of short stories by Ray Bradbury.

Issue guide

References

External links

EC Comics publications
Science fiction comics
Comics anthologies
Comics by Carl Wessler
Defunct American comics